Crossroads is an unincorporated community in Summers County, West Virginia, United States, located northeast of Hinton.

References

Unincorporated communities in Summers County, West Virginia
Unincorporated communities in West Virginia